Mark Stein is an American football coach.  He is the head football coach at Martin Luther College in New Ulm, Minnesota, a position he has held since 2015. Inheriting a depleted roster during his first seasons, Stein has led a rebuilding of the MLC program, highlighted by being named Upper Midwest Athletic Conference Coach of the Year in 2017.

Head coaching record

College

References

External links
 Martin Luther profile

Year of birth missing (living people)
Living people
Martin Luther Knights football coaches
High school football coaches in Wisconsin